"I Wish I Was Eighteen Again" is a song written by Sonny Throckmorton in 1979.

Jerry Lee Lewis version

Jerry Lee Lewis originally recorded the song for his self-titled album in 1979. It was released as the B-side of "Rockin' My Life Away".

The song was a Top 20 hit on the Billboard Country chart, peaking at No. 18.

Chart performance

George Burns version

A year later, comedian-actor George Burns covered the song for his 1980 album of the same title. The song was also featured in the 1988 film 18 Again!, in which Burns starred.

Burns' cover slightly missed the Top 40 on the Billboard Hot 100, peaking at No. 49. However, it was a Top 40 hit on the Easy Listening and Country charts. Despite being his only entry to both charts, it did better than Lewis' version in the Country chart, peaking at No. 15.

Chart performance

Ray Price version
Ray Price covered the song for his 2014 posthumous album Beauty Is... The Final Sessions.

References

Songs written by Sonny Throckmorton
1979 songs
1979 singles
Jerry Lee Lewis songs
Elektra Records singles
1980 singles
Mercury Records singles
George Burns songs